Myrtle Abigail Porlucas Sarrosa (born December 7, 1994) is a Filipino actress, cosplayer, host, singer, songwriter and gamer who rose to prominence after being declared the Pinoy Big Brother: Teen Edition 4 Big Winner. Sarrosa started her career under ABS-CBN where she was launched as one of the Star Magic Angels. She is currently managed and under contract with GMA Artist Center.

Sarrosa was the Official VJ or Anime Jockey for Hero TV, the main female presenter for ABS-CBN Sports and Action's NCAA Basketball Championship (Philippines), a feature host for the morning show, Umagang Kay Ganda  and a performer on the second season of the show, Your Face Sounds Familiar. She was also the cover girl of various magazines and became the 2018 Calendar Girl of Ginebra San Miguel.

After signing a record deal with Ivory Music & Video (Sony Music Philippines) in 2016, Sarrosa released her major-label debut studio album, Now Playing: Myrtle (2016) which was awarded a certified Gold Award by the Philippine Association of the Record Industry for its outstanding album sales. Aside from writing all her songs from her album, she also wrote the songs for other artists namely Jennylyn Mercado and Maja Salvador.

Sarrosa graduated cum laude from the Philippines' top university, University of the Philippines, with a degree in broadcast communication and served as the Sangguniang Kabataan President in her hometown Barotac Nuevo, Iloilo.

Personal life
Myrtle Sarrosa was born to Rodolfo Sarrosa Jr., a Filipino politician and Tam Porlucas, a Filipina accountant. Sarrosa was born and raised in Barotac Nuevo, Iloilo, Visayas, Philippines. At the age of fourteen, Sarrosa started participating in Cosplay Conventions and won several awards for cosplaying in the Philippines.

By the age of fifteen, Sarrosa served as the Sanggunian Kabataan (English: Youth Council) President of her municipality, Barotac Nuevo, Iloilo, Philippines where she became the chairman of the Committee of Youth and Sports. Before joining Pinoy Big Brother: Teen Edition 4, Sarrosa was an accounting student of the University of the Philippines Visayas but transferred to the university's main Diliman campus in 2013. Sarrosa worked as full-time actress and host while attending classes in the UP College of Mass Communication. Sarrosa graduated cum laude from the Philippines' top university with a degree in BA Broadcast Communication. Aside from receiving Latin Honors, Sarrosa was awarded multiple times for her research in cosplay's history in the Philippines.

In her private life, She previously had a relationship to Sen. Grace Poe-Llamanzares' son Brian but separated before the 2016 Presidential Elections.

Pinoy Big Brother
Sarrosa was dubbed Cosplay Cutie ng Iloilo, Sarrosa entered the house of Big Brother on Day 2 together with the other female housemates. On Day 91 at the Malolos Sports and Convention Center in Bulacan, she was declared the Big Winner after garnering a massive 33.92% percent of internet votes and triumphed over Karen Reyes with 11.91%, Roy Requejo with 9.38%, and twins Jai and Joj Agpangan with 9.26%.

Career
In 2012, after winning Pinoy Big Brother: Teen Edition 4, Sarrosa launched her acting and recording career in the Philippines. Sarrosa joined the cast of the Filipino television-drama, Kahit Puso'y Masugatan, together with her on-screen partners, Kit Thompson and Yves Flores. Sarrosa became a regular performer for the weekend variety program ASAP (variety show) where she was named the Pop Viewer's Choice Awardee as Pop Female Cutie.

During that same year, Sarrosa and Young JV also released their digital single entitled, "Your Name", which ranked Number 1 on MYX. Later, Sarrosa launched her hosting career by becoming the Official VJ or Anime Jockey for Hero TV. Sarrosa was also a recurring cast as Maristela on the Filipino comedy sitcom TodaMax for two years. Sarrosa was acknowledged by various award recognition bodies such as the PMPC Star Awards for television and the Golden Screen Awards for her performances as an actress in 2012.

In 2013, Sarrosa released a self-titled album under Star Records with the carrier single "Mr. Kupido", which got her a nomination as the Best New Female Recording Artist during the PMPC Star Awards for Music. The official music video for her song starred Sarrosa and Enrique Gil. Sarrosa also became the official resident cosplay judge and host for the first Philippine cosplay show, iCosplay. Later that year till the beginning of the year 2014, Sarrosa starred in the television series Moon of Desire as Anise and top billed for "Mahal Ko Si Sir" on Ipaglaban Mo as Dolly. She also became the cover girl for November 2014 issue of FHM Philippines.

In 2015, Sarrosa became a regular feature and travel host for the morning show Umagang Kay Ganda and became the main female presenter for basketball, volleyball and cheer dance for the National Collegiate Athletic Association (Philippines) during its Season 91 and 92. Sarrosa also became one of the eight celebrity performers on the second season of the show, Your Face Sounds Familiar. She also joined by her PBB Teen predecessor James Reid and Nadine Lustre, for Maalaala Mo Kaya's Valentines episode "Signs of Love" and joined Enrique Gil and Liza Soberano in the television series, Forevermore. She also became a part of the fourth batch of lucky stars in the game show, Kapamilya Deal or No Deal where she donated her winnings to 29 Barangay Daycares in her home province, Iloilo City, Philippines. In that same year, Sarrosa was relaunched on ASAP (variety show) as one of Star Magic's Star Magic Angels where she was titled the "Playful Angel".

In 2016, Sarrosa became the host of Hero (TV channel)'s flagship show My Hero Nation. She also launched her second album under Ivory Music & Video (Sony Music Philippines) entitled Now Playing: Myrtle which was a certified Gold Awardee by the Philippine Association of the Record Industry. She released the song Mr. Pakipot as her album's first single. Aside from writing all her songs from her album, she also wrote the songs Lampara and Magkaibang Mundo together with Jonathan Ong for Jennylyn Mercado's Album entitled Ultimate and Maja Salvador's Single Haplos. Sarrosa also became a regular cast of the family fantasy show My Super D, FPJ's Ang Probinsyano and top billed the Ipaglaban Mo! episode entitled Hayok.

In 2017, Sarrosa starred in the highest rating TV Film on TV5 Philippines' entitled Wattled Presents: AFGITMOLFM where she was partnered with Richard Juan and Kino Rementilla. She also became the host of another Hero (TV channel) Program, Hero Tambayan. She also launched another single entitled LABEL featuring Abra (rapper) which won her the Favorite Music Video Award during the 30th Awit Awards. Sarrosa was also a part of the cast of La Luna Sangre as one of the main antagonists before joining the cast of The Good Son (TV series). In the same year, she also starred in another controversial Ipaglaban Mo! episode entitled Tuliro where she played the role of a Schizophrenic.

In 2018, Sarrosa covered for the men's magazine FHM Philippines during their February issue and became the 2018 calendar girl of the liquor brand, Ginebra San Miguel. She also became the host of The Filipino Channel and ABS-CBN Sports and Action's program, The First Five and became the official muse of the Barangay Ginebra San Miguel basketball team in the Philippine Basketball Association (PBA).

In 2020, Myrtle moved to GMA Network after eight years being a Kapamilya talent.

Advocacy
Sarrosa is an advocate for youth. She is the Sanggunian Kabataan President in her home municipality and an active participant in programs and fundraising projects by Ako Ang Simula and Sagip Kapamilya. On December 6, 2012, Sarrosa held a feeding program for 29 barangays in Barotac Nuevo, Iloilo and donated chairs for 10 barangay day cares. On December 9, 2012, Sarrosa celebrated her 18th birthday with cancer patients from Pedis Hema Onco with the help of Ako Ang Simula and her endorsement, Lolita.

Discography

Albums
 Myrtle Sarrosa (Self Titled Album) (2013)
Now Playing: Myrtle (2016) – Certified Gold Award by PARI in October 2016

Singles

Heartbroken

Song Writer
Lampara – Jennylyn Mercado
Magkaibang Mundo – Jennylyn Mercado
Haplos Maja Salvador

Filmography

Awards and nominations

References

External links
 
 
  of Pinoy Big Brother
 Sparkle profile

1994 births
Living people
Pinoy Big Brother contestants
Big Brother (franchise) winners
Filipino film actresses
Filipino television actresses
Filipino child actresses
People from Iloilo City
Actresses from Iloilo
Hiligaynon people
Filipina gravure idols
Cosplayers
University of the Philippines Diliman alumni
University of the Philippines Visayas alumni
Star Magic
ABS-CBN personalities
GMA Network personalities